Jindra Holá (born 2 October 1960) is a Czech former ice dancer who represented Czechoslovakia. Competing with Karol Foltán, she became the 1983 Prague Skate champion, a three-time Winter Universiade medalist (silver in 1983 and 1985, bronze in 1981), and a three-time Czechoslovak national champion. The two also competed at the 1984 Winter Olympics.

Career 
Early in her ice dancing career, Holá competed in partnership with Jiří Pokorný. The duo won the silver medal at the Czechoslovak Championships in the 1977–1978 season.

The following season, Holá teamed up with Karol Foltán. After taking the national bronze medal, they placed 14th at the 1979 European Championships in Zagreb, Yugoslavia, and 17th at the 1979 World Championships in Vienna, Austria. The two would finish 14th at the 1980 World Championships in Dortmund, West Germany. They received the bronze medal at the 1981 Winter Universiade in Jaca, Spain.

Holá/Foltán finished 9th at the 1983 European Championships in Dortmund and then received the silver medal at the 1983 Winter Universiade in Sofia, Bulgaria.

During their penultimate season, the duo took gold at the 1983 Prague Skate and placed 9th at the 1984 European Championships in Budapest, Hungary. In February 1984, they competed at the Winter Olympics in Sarajevo, Yugoslavia. They ranked 14th in the compulsory dances, 12th in the original set pattern dance, 13th in the free dance, and 13th overall.

Holá/Foltán's best continental result, 8th, came at the 1985 European Championships in Gothenburg, Sweden. Making their final competitive appearance, they won the silver medal at the 1985 Winter Universiade in Belluno, Italy.

Competitive highlights

With Foltán

With Pokorný

References 

1960 births
Czech female ice dancers
Czechoslovak female ice dancers
Figure skaters at the 1984 Winter Olympics
Living people
Olympic figure skaters of Czechoslovakia
Figure skaters from Prague
Universiade medalists in figure skating
Universiade silver medalists for Czechoslovakia
Universiade bronze medalists for Czechoslovakia
Competitors at the 1981 Winter Universiade
Competitors at the 1983 Winter Universiade
Competitors at the 1985 Winter Universiade